St. Peter's Cathedral, Charlottetown, Prince Edward Island, Canada, was founded in 1869 as a result of the influence of the Oxford Movement. Since that time, the parish has remained Anglo-Catholic in ethos and practice.

General Information
St. Peter's was designated a cathedral in 1879 by Bishop Hibbert Binney, the Bishop of Nova Scotia. Over the years, it has served as a second cathedral of the Anglican Diocese of Nova Scotia (now called  Nova Scotia and Prince Edward Island). The principal cathedral of the diocese is All Saints' Cathedral in Halifax. The diocese contains two civil provinces of Canada. 
St. Peter's Cathedral is located on Rochford Square, corner of All Souls' Lane and Rochford Street, Charlottetown.

Attached to the west side of the cathedral is All Souls' Chapel—designated as a National Historic Site in 1990.  See All Souls' Chapel (Prince Edward Island).

History
The founding of St. Peter's was directly linked to a theological and liturgical revival of the Catholic tradition within Anglicanism, known as the Oxford Movement or Tractarian Movement. This Movement began in England in the 1830s, and spread throughout the Anglican Communion worldwide. By the 1860s, some parishioners of the already long-established St. Paul's Church, in Charlottetown, had been exposed to the Oxford Movement through their travels, and wanted to erect a new church building where the teachings and liturgical observances of that movement could be reflected and practiced.

Land for the new church was made available by Mr.William Cundall, and construction began in 1867. By the spring of 1869, the building was completed, and Mr. Cundall then officially gave the land to the church on June 1, 1869. The opening services were held on June 13 of that year, but the Cathedral was not consecrated until the Feast of St. Peter, June 29, 1879. It was constructed in an area of the city known as West Bog. "This neighbourhood was considered disreputable", we are told. Today, however, it is known as an ideal and central location, standing as it does, directly across the street from our Provincial Government Building.

As you enter St Peter's, you will find a pamphlet rack in the vestibule. In it you will discover an interesting assortment of tracts and booklets. As mentioned above, St. Peter's was founded largely as a result of the "Tractarian Movement" in Britain, and of its effect on many of the younger members of the Prince Edward Island church community. The Tractarian or Oxford Movement embodied a renewed interest in the Catholic heritage of Anglicanism. Tracts (pamphlets) were one of the primary means used to spread the Movement's teachings and beliefs; hence the name Tractarian.

On the right, as you come through the door with the statue of the Risen Christ above it, is the baptistery. The Baptistery is a memorial to Sister Theresa (daughter of William Cundall, donor of the land) of the Community of St. John the Baptist, Clewes, England. The window beside it is in memory of the Reverend Canon E. M. Malone, who was Incumbent of St. Peter's Cathedral for 31 years. Canon Malone, a scholarly man with an excellent singing voice, was well known for his love of and work with children, as well as his belief in guardian angels. Both these themes are portrayed in his memorial window. If you are interested in stained glass, you will find in St. Peter's and in All Souls' Chapel several examples of outstanding design and craftsmanship.

As has been said, St. Peter's Cathedral was founded in 1869 as a result of the Oxford Movement. It is a unique church in many ways. Choir members have worn surplices since the opening of the church. As early as 1872 the Rood Screen was erected and the seven hanging lamps placed in the sanctuary. The envelope system was adopted in 1876, and the pews have always been free. Altar candles have been used since 1877, and Eucharistic vestments since 1889. In that year the first white cope to be used in the Ecclesiastical Province of Canada was worn here. On Ash Wednesday, 1890, the daily celebration of the Holy Eucharist was established, and this ideal has been maintained to the present day. (Devotional and spiritual life centred in the Holy Eucharist is very important to members of a parish such as St. Peter's). The magnificent vestments, altar frontals, jewelled chalice, baptismal shell, an illustrated altar missal and other ornaments not common in Canadian Anglicanism are a constant source of joy and interest to Cathedral worshippers and visitors. In recent years some of our vestments have been made at St. Peter's. Lovers of art, music, architecture, and good liturgy would do well to visit St. Peter's, where all of these things combine to set forth the glory of God, and where devout Christians can worship God in the "beauty of holiness". When mediocrity is so often the standard today, it is our sincere intention at St. Peter's Cathedral to strive for excellence and true beauty.

Originally, chairs were used at St. Peter's. In 1928, these were replaced by pews of dark walnut-coloured Douglas fir. The pulpit is the design of William Critchlow Harris, the brother of Robert Harris the artist, whose paintings beautify All Souls' Chapel. William Critchlow Harris was also the architect of All Souls' Chapel.

The High Altar (complete with an Altar Stone) is still in its traditional position. Behind the Altar you will see statues of the four evangelists (Matthew, Mark, Luke, and John), and of our Blessed Lord.

Our memorial stained glass windows are of high quality. Many of them were crafted in England by Kemp & Son, of London, England, one of the most prominent designers of stained glass. Along the walls of the cathedral you will observe the Stations of the Cross, another memorial, speaking of the Catholic faith that is believed and proclaimed at St. Peter's. An Ikon of the Blessed Virgin Mary, prepared especially for St. Peter's in a monastery in Greece, and donated to us a number of years ago by an Orthodox friend and supporter, hangs on the rear wall of the cathedral, on the Gospel side.

A list of the sons and daughters of St. Peter's reveals the names of several people, prominent in their day, who, having served the Lord and His Church with joy and faithfulness, are now at rest. Two "Islanders" have served as Parish Priests. The first Priest Incumbent, an Islander, the Reverend George Wright Hodgson, served from 1869 until his early death, in his 44th year, in 1885. Prior to his appointment to St. Peter's, Father Hodgson had been chaplain to Bishop Binney. He laid the foundation at St. Peter's, on which others have built.

In the early days of the parish, members of St. Peter's were subject to petty persecutions, and were often misunderstood and criticized by some of their fellow Anglicans and by those of other Christian denominations who were not in sympathy with the Tractarian Movement. For example, the choir of men and boys, vested in cassocks and surplices, were jeered at as "night shirt boys". One Sunday morning, it is said, a notice was posted on the door, "Hodgson's junction, all change here for Rome".

After Father Hodgson's death, Father Armstrong from Toronto and Father Smythe from the West Indies acted on an interim basis until Canon James Simpson was appointed the second Priest Incumbent. He was inducted Sexagesima, 1887, and remained until his death in 1920. A former master at Port Hope School, Canon Simpson had as his assistant the Reverend Thomas Henry Hunt. Dr. Hunt was a fine scholar and able teacher, who is still remembered with affection and respect by those whom he taught both here and afterwards at King's College, Halifax. Both men contributed greatly to St. Peter's School, opened in 1872, and to the girls' school, which was added three years later. Canon Simpson, along with Mr. William Critchlow Harris (architect) and Mr. Robert Harris, C.M.G. (artist) are largely responsible for All Souls' Chapel, a place of great beauty, pointing weary, discouraged pilgrims to the risen, ascended Christ, the Lord of all life, in whose presence is joy and life eternal in the communion of saints. In course of time, a son of Canon Simpson, The Very Rev'd Cuthbert Simpson, became Dean of Christ Church, Oxford, England. (1959-1969).

Canon Elwyn Mortimer Malone followed Canon Simpson. Originally from Antigua, he was to remain 31 years at St. Peter's. It was during his tenure of office that the property ceased to be vested in Trustees and was turned over to the Rector, Wardens, and Vestry.

In 1952 Canon Gerald E. Moffatt became Rector of the Cathedral. While he was at St. Peter's, the Cathedral was painted and made much lighter inside. Traditionally, Sunday School had been held at 2:00 p.m. Canon Moffatt had this changed to 10:00 a.m. The main Eucharist on a Sunday was at 11:00 a.m., when only the aged and infirm were expected to receive Holy Communion, a custom which had been followed since the establishment of the parish. (This practice was in keeping with the Tractarian tradition of the parish, and was intended to encourage faithful communicants to fast before receiving Holy Communion, that is, by receiving the Sacrament at the early service at 8 a.m.).

Archdeacon J. R. Davies became Rector in 1958, and remained at St. Peter's until 1967. He was a gentle, deeply spiritual man and one who did much to encourage a sense of stewardship. During his time here, the Rectory was redecorated.

Archdeacon G. S. Tanton, the second Islander to serve at St. Peter's, became Rector in 1967. He exercised a vigorous leadership, not only in the Parish, but in the Diocesan Church Society and Island Church life. In his day there was a renewed call for a Bishop to be resident on Prince Edward Island. Canon Simpson had argued for this in his day, as had the Diocesan Church Society during the last century. It was during Archdeacon Tanton's incumbency that all communicant members of the church were permitted to receive Holy Communion at the 11 o'clock service. Unfortunately, illness necessitated Father Tanton's early retirement.

In 1974, Canon H.M.D. Westin became the seventh Parish Priest and served until his retirement in October 1990. Aside from his spiritual and pastoral work as a dedicated priest, he is remembered for his founding of what is now the annual Atlantic Theological Conference. The "Need for a Catholic Voice in the Church Today" was the subject of the initial summer conference which Father Westin organized as part of the Cathedral's observance of its Patronal Festival in 1981. For 14 years the conference met under his leadership, and now continues to meet annually in one of the three Maritime capitals. The conferences are attended by clergy and laity who are concerned with current problems in the Church, and they have attracted scholars from most of the Anglican world. From these conferences sprang "St. Peter Publications" which has shown a steady growth since its inception. It publishes "A Canadian Church Calendar", Common Prayer Commentaries, a Sunday School curriculum, as well as numerous books, pamphlets and tracts. Each year, St. Peter Publications publishes a book containing the papers presented at the previous year's theological conference. For a number of years, St. Peter Publications produced a quarterly periodical, The Anglican Free Press.

During Father Westin's time as Rector, all of the stained glass windows in the Cathedral and Chapel were re-leaded, and the west side of Church House on Rochford Square was made into parish offices and offices for St. Peter Publications, with the Sexton's residence on the upper floor. Father Westin retired shortly before the end of 1990.

The next Rector, The Rev'd Canon Peter Harris, came to us from Nova Scotia in April 1989. He served for almost two years as Assistant Priest, before being appointed Rector at the end of 1990. Canon Harris continued as Rector of the parish until the end of November, 2014. The Rev'd David Garrett succeeded Canon Harris as Rector in December 2014.

A new parish hall attached to the cathedral was erected in 2004, replacing an older hall that had stood on that site for over 100 years.

A full schedule of Sunday and weekday worship is maintained (Matins, Evensong, and the Holy Eucharist), and there are numerous parish organizations and activities.

All Souls' Chapel 
All Souls' Chapel was originally conceived as a memorial to Father George Hodgson, the first "priest-incumbent" of St. Peter's Cathedral, and was built in 1888 to plans prepared by William Critchlow Harris, ARCA (1854-1913), a member of the first class confirmed in St Peter's Church in 1869. The arched reredos, with statues of apostles and evangelists occupying the niches, is typical of Harris's altar screens. The Chapel walls are occupied by 16 paintings by William's brother, Robert Harris, CMG, PRCA (1849 - 1919). The round painting above the reredos is of Christ ascending to Heaven, and has been a treasured icon to generations of Cathedral parishioners. The Chapel was built by Lowe Brothers of Charlottetown, and the woodwork was carved by Messrs Whitlock and Doull.

The Sanctuary is that part of the Chapel inside the great arch, and contains the Altar, at which the Holy Mysteries of Christ's Body and Blood in the Eucharist have been celebrated daily since 1890. Set into the front of the Altar are three roundels painted by Robert Harris that show (a) Christ known of his companions "in the breaking of bread" at Emmaus on the Day of His Resurrection; (b) His Crucifixion; (c) Christ administering the Chalice to communicants. In the arched niches of the Reredos are statues of Christ (centre) flanked by St. John and St. James on His right and St. Peter on His left, with additional Apostles, including St. Paul, carrying the instruments used to put them to death.  To the right of the Altar is the Credence Table, on which the Bread and Wine are placed before the Offertory. Set high in the side walls of the Sanctuary are portraits (left) of St. Luke the Evangelist, by tradition an artist as well as a physician, a memorial to Robert Harris; and (right) St. James the Just, a memorial to Canon James Simpson, who played an important part in planning the Chapel before his death in 1920. Every subject inside the Sanctuary is drawn from the New Testament Church.

The Arch is made from grey Wallace freestone, from the Nova Scotia side of the Northumberland Strait, and is richly carved with foliage and teardrops to symbolise both the Life Christ gives and the sorrows He suffered. The earliest churches built in Rome in the 4th century incorporated triumphal arches honoring Christ as King of kings and Lord of lords, and celebrating His victory over sin and death. William Harris always incorporated this feature in his church designs.

The Nave: the Gospel side is lined with portraits of early Church Fathers, as follows:

St. Gregory the Great, shown with a blond Anglo-Saxon acolyte, illustrates a story told by the Venerable Bede. One day Gregory saw some fair-haired children for sale in the slave market in Rome. "What nation are they?" he asked. "They're Angles (English)," he was told. "Non Angli sed angeli (not Angles but angels)!" punned Gregory. He wished to evangelise the English; but when he was made Pope instead he sent 40 monks under St. Augustine of Canterbury to England in 597, and the Church of England was the result.

St. John Chrysostom, Patriarch of Constantinople 398 - 407, was a celebrated preacher (chrysostom means golden-tongued) and reformer who was deliberately killed by his enemies in the Byzantine court and Church by enforced travelling on foot in cold weather. Harris mistakenly shows him wearing the western-style chasuble and alb instead of an eastern phelonion

St. Augustine of Hippo (354 - 430) was one of the most influential theologians in Church history. Once, while writing his book on God titled De Trinitate (On the Trinity), he went for a stroll on the beach where he saw a small boy running back and forth with a bucket, pouring water from the shore into a hole he'd dug in the sand. "What are you doing?" asked Augustine. "I am pouring the sea into this hole," replied the boy. Augustine thought, "I'm no different - trying to get the great mystery of God inside my little head!"

St. Ambrose, Bishop of Milan 374 - 97, is shown refusing the Emperor Theodosius I entry to the basilica in Milan on Easter Day because he had massacred 7000 people in Thessalonica.

St. Jerome (342 - 420), settled in Bethlehem in 386, where he lived in a cave next to that in which Christ had been born, translating the Scriptures from Hebrew and Greek into Latin. He enjoyed controversies with heretics, kept a pet lion (to discourage interruptions?) and a skull to remind himself of his mortality.

St. Athanasius, Patriarch of Alexandria 328 - 373 became known as Athanasius Contra Mundum (Against the World) for his resolute support of orthodox Nicene Christianity in opposition to the Arian heresy which denied the divinity of Christ. For most of his life he was persecuted and often exiled; but his resolute character as well as his theology proved to be the outstanding obstacle to the triumph of Arianism, which faded away in the next century.

The Nave Windows: the first two (the Archangel St. Michael and the Blessed Virgin Mary & Child) are by Kemp and are memorials to Frank Carvell and Margaret Mathilda Jane Hodgson respectively. Notice the crownedM and the serpent (symbol of evil) being trodden underfoot in both pictures, as well as other symbols drawn from the Revelation of St. John the Divine. The third window, from the William Morris Studio, shows Christ as Christus Rex, or Christ the King, and is a memorial to a sister of Robert, William and Thomas Harris, Margaret Ellin Harris (1854 - 1944) and her husband, William Lawson Cotton, 1848 - 1928. It also has a serpent.

The Entrance Wall of All Souls' Chapel has three Robert Harris paintings which return to New Testament themes:

The Raising of Dorcas, a memorial to Dorcas Octavia Pedder Desbrisay, in illustration of the story told in Acts 9 of the raising of Dorcas by St. Peter.

Christ Calling St. Andrew to become "a fisher of men". The figure of Andrew is a portrait of Thomas Harris, Robert and William Harris's older brother, who died in 1904. The painting is in his memory.

The Crucifixion of Christ, over the door, is in memory of William C. Harris, the Chapel's architect, and was the last painting to be installed in the Chapel. Appropriately, it is placed under a window showing Christ's Resurrection. The painting and the window placed over the door suggest that it is "through the grave and gate of death" that we pass to our joyful resurrection. Inside the door, in the small porch, is a statue of St. Peter holding the keys "to the Kingdom of Heaven" (see St. Matt. 16: 18-19).

Two terra cotta medallions, of St. Peter and St. Paul, are set high in the entrance wall of the Chapel. Originally 14 such medallions were planned, but only these two were made. Eventually a set of Stations of the Cross was obtained, and 12 (of the 14) were set in the places prepared for the medallions. Fine imported encaustic tiles sheathe the upper reaches of the wall.

The Epistle Side also has three Robert Harris paintings, two showing persons only recently deceased when the paintings were made.

The Morson Boys, two brothers who died within days of each other in 1899, are shown with other children with Christ in Paradise.

The Martyrdom of St. Stephen, stoned to death in Jerusalem c.35 after preaching a sermon his hearers disliked (Acts 6), occupies the space over the doors to the sacristy. Two of the doors accommodate Latin memorials to the Reverend George Hodgson and Canon James Simpson, the Cathedral's first Incumbents (so styled rather than Dean because St. Peter's was not given a Chapter when it was made the Anglican Cathedral for Prince Edward Island in 1879). A third door panel commemorates Robert and William Harris.

The Harris Family, a group portrait, shows members of the family who died before 1914 (with the exception of Thomas, who is portrayed elsewhere) as a Holy Land family being blessed by Christ. In the centre sits mother, Sarah Stretch Harris (1818 - 1897) with Tom's son Clare Harris (1880 - 1892) standing alongside her, and his sister, Dora Harris (1892 - 1911), sitting in front. To the left of Clare is Martha (Little Patty) Harris (1856 - 1864), a sibling of Thomas, Robert, William and Margaret Ellin. Leaning over Sarah is William Critchlow Harris junior (1854 - 1913), the Chapel's architect, and sitting back in the shadows is the family patriarch, William Critchlow Harris senior (1813 - 1899), who brought his family to Charlottetown from Liverpool, England, on the barque Isabel in 1856. Each of the trees in nearby Rochford Square, planted in 1884, represents a Harris family member.

Over the years many memorials have been placed in All Souls' Chapel. The pews commemorate Mrs. George Hodgson, who died in 1934, and accommodate the living worshippers who, surrounded by the apostles and saints of old, and the faithful departed, complete the scheme of All Souls under the Lordship of Christ in the altar painting. Most of the plates commemorate deceased members of the Cathedral congregation, some of them familiar names from the civic and social life of Charlottetown in days gone by. One carries a portrait of Ruth Harris (1893 - 1984), a niece of Robert Harris, daughter of his youngest brother Ned, made from Robert's charcoal sketch of her when she was 24.

The kneelers, made by women of the Cathedral congregation, show the phoenix, a mythical bird supposed to have come back to life after perishing by fire - a symbol of the Resurrection.

On the organ a Book of Remembrance contains names of deceased members of the Cathedral congregation.

The Sanctuary Lamp carries a white light, symbolic of Christ's Real Presence in the Blessed Sacrament, and showing that it is reserved nearby. Anglican Church teaching affirms Christ's Real Presence in the Sacrament while rejecting Transubstantiation as an explanation of the manner of it.

Morning Prayer and Evening Prayer are said daily in the Chapel, and the Holy Eucharist is celebrated Tuesdays at 7:30 a.m. and other weekdays (except Mondays) at 10 a.m. If Monday is a Holy Day, Evening Prayer is followed by a celebration of the Holy Communion. Morning Prayer is said 15 minutes before the Eucharist. This daily round of worship and prayer is part of the liturgy or work of the Cathedral. The Chapel is open every day for personal prayer and meditation.

The Book of Common Prayer and The English Hymnal are used in the Chapel. Some suppose that there are two Anglican churches, one high and one low. This is not so: these are only emphases within the one Church whose official doctrine, as set out in the Canadian Book of Common Prayer (1962), is that of Catholic orthodoxy and antiquity, reformed in the time of Queen Elizabeth I on the basis of the New Testament and the early Church councils.

References

External links

 St. Peter's Cathedral, Charlottetown website
 A Brief History of St. Peter's Cathedral

Anglican cathedrals in Canada
Religious organizations established in 1869
Churches in Charlottetown
19th-century Anglican church buildings in Canada
1869 establishments in the British Empire
Anglo-Catholic church buildings in Canada
Anglo-Catholic cathedrals
Anglican church buildings in Prince Edward Island